Agarakattu is a village, which located on the banks of the Hanuman River. This Village and Tenkasi are very closely located with each other. The majority of Catholics are part of the community. This Village and Shengottai Taluk was the part of Travancore (Present Kerala) and ruled by the Maharaja of Kingdom of Travancore. In the early 19th century, the kingdom became a Princely State of the British Empire. The Travancore Government and Maharaja ruled this area till 1956. Government of India decided to Merge the Agarakattu and Shengottai taluk with Tamil Nadu State after the great struggle and protest held in Shengottai and Nagercoil. On November 1, 1956 Agarakattu, Shengottai Taluk and Kanyakumari District were officially merged with Tamilnadu by K. Kamaraj the Honorable Chief Minister of Tamil Nadu.

History
Earlier in Ayikudi, the more number of Brahmins are lived. They used palm leaves to write and maintain the documents. Brahmins brought Nadar community people from Moolakadu village to collect palm leaves. Then the Dissident with Brahmins, they moved out and settled in the nearby forest. That is the forest of Aavaram Senna and Palm trees. Then that forest area became a residential area called "Avarakadu". Then it derived into Agarakattu or Agarai.

State Border Issues
In 1947, India became independent country. But the Kingdom of Travancore(now Kerala) decided not to join the Indian federation. However, there is no way the king of travancore joined to India. In 1949, the tamil areas from sengottah to Sambavarvadakarai merged with United States of Trivangore - Kochin. The Tivancore government has frozen the schemes for agricultural development in the tamil areas. To get liberation from caste-related violence, which has been around for 200 years. the tamil people stated protest against Trivancore Govt in Kanyakumari with the leadership of Mr.Marshal Nesamony. Especially Nadar community started a protest against Nair community. For that, Travancore Government fired on the protesters; 11 people were killed in the shooting. Five of them are Nadar community. As a result, on 1 November 1956 Kaniyakumari district and Sengottai taluk were merged with Tamil Nadu.

References 

Tirunelveli district